Tidjani Anaane (born 29 March 1997) is a Beninese professional footballer who plays as a midfielder for Doxa Katokopias and the Benin national team.

International career
Anaane made his debut for the Benin national football team in a 2019 Africa Cup of Nations qualification 2-1 win over Togo on 27 March 2019.

References

External links
 
 
 Tidjani Anaane at Footballdatabase

1997 births
Living people
Beninese footballers
Benin international footballers
ASPAC FC players
Espérance Sportive de Tunis players
US Monastir (football) players
US Ben Guerdane players
AS Soliman players
Tunisian Ligue Professionnelle 1 players
Association football midfielders
Beninese expatriate footballers
Beninese expatriate sportspeople in Tunisia
Expatriate footballers in Tunisia
2019 Africa Cup of Nations players